Orange Twin Field Works: Volume I or Bulgarian Field Recordings Vol. 1 is a collection of field recordings of Bulgarian folk music released by Jeff Mangum, of Neutral Milk Hotel. The album contains one track, a little over a half-hour of different segments from a single instance of the Koprivshtitsa festival.

Track listing
"Field Works" – 33:46

References

External links
Orange Twin Field Works: Volume I at Orange Twin Records

2001 live albums
2001 compilation albums
Folk compilation albums
Live folk albums
Folk albums by Bulgarian artists
Sound collage albums
World music albums by American artists
Field recording